Falling Sky is a 2002 Norwegian drama film directed by Gunnar Vikene.

Cast 
 Kristoffer Joner - Reidar
 Maria Bonnevie - Juni
 Kim Bodnia - Johannes
 Hildegun Riise - Vigdis
 Gitte Rio Jørgensen - Fru Ruud
 Endre Hellestveit - Thomas

References

External links 
 

2002 films
Norwegian Christmas drama films
2000s Christmas drama films
2002 drama films
2000s Norwegian-language films